Kyōto 2nd district was a multi-member constituency of the House of Representatives in the Diet of Japan. Between 1947 and 1993 it elected five Representatives by single non-transferable vote. It was located in Kyōto and, as of 1993, consisted of Kyōto city's Ukyō, Fushimi and Nishikyō wards and all other cities, towns and villages in the prefecture.

Representatives for Kyōto 2nd district included Democratic Party president and prime minister Hitoshi Ashida, LDP faction leader, secretary general and justice minister Shigesaburō Maeo, education minister Sen'ichi Tanigaki and his son Sadakazu and home affairs minister Hiromu Nonaka. Since Kyoto was thea stronghold of the Communist Party, Kyoto's two electoral districts were among the few districts in the country where the JCP ever nominated more than one candidate – in its last such attempt in the 2nd district in the 1983 general election, both Communist candidates lost due to vote splitting.

Summary of results during the 1955 party system

Elected Representatives

Last election result 1993

References 

Politics of Kyoto Prefecture
Districts of the House of Representatives (Japan)